J. Mandela Barnes  (born December 1, 1986) is an American politician who served the 45th lieutenant governor of Wisconsin from 2019 to 2023. A member of the Democratic Party, he was the state representative for the 11th district from 2013 to 2017. Barnes is the first African American to serve as Wisconsin's lieutenant governor.

Barnes was the Democratic nominee in the 2022 U.S. Senate election in Wisconsin, losing to incumbent Republican Senator Ron Johnson.

Early life and education 
Barnes was born in Milwaukee on December 1, 1986, the son of a public school teacher and a United Auto Workers member. Jesse is his father's name and his middle name, Mandela, is a tribute to the anti-apartheid activist and first South African black president Nelson Mandela. Barnes says he has gone by his middle name since birth. His legal name is J. Mandela Barnes.

Barnes attended Holy Redeemer Christian Academy in Milwaukee; Milwaukee Public Schools, including John Marshall High School; and Alabama A&M University.

Barnes was involved with the National Association for the Advancement of Colored People (NAACP) during college. He has also said that Barack Obama's keynote speech at the 2004 Democratic National Convention inspired him to rethink his post-college career.

In August 2019, Barnes admitted that he had never officially completed his bachelor's degree in 2008 due to incomplete coursework in one class that he called a "minor technical issue", contrary to previous statements that he had graduated from Alabama A&M. He received his B.A. degree in communications media specializing in performance on May 1, 2020, after resolving the outstanding coursework issue with the university.

Political career 
Barnes worked for various political campaigns and in the office of Milwaukee Mayor Tom Barrett, eventually becoming an organizer for M.I.C.A.H., a Milwaukee-based interfaith coalition that advocates social justice. He served as deputy director of strategic engagement for State Innovation Exchange, a national progressive public policy organization based in Madison, from December 2016 to December 2017.

Wisconsin State Assembly (2013–2017)

In April 2012, Barnes announced his candidacy for Wisconsin's 11th Assembly district, representing the north side of Milwaukee and a small part of Wauwatosa, challenging incumbent Jason Fields in the Democratic primary election. His campaign made major issues of Fields's support for the school voucher program and opposition to limiting interest rates charged by payday loan companies, which can exceed a 500% annual percentage rate.

Barnes defeated Fields in the August 2012 primary with 2,596 votes to Fields's 1,206. In the November general election Barnes was unopposed. He received 16,403 votes to 201 votes for others.

As a state legislator in 2013, Barnes sponsored a bill that would have banned assault weapons and high-capacity magazines.

Barnes was reelected in 2014 without a primary or general election challenge.

Barnes sponsored a 2016 bill to eliminate cash bail. It would have barred judges from considering the "nature, number and gravity" of the charges and required the release of a defendant unless there was "clear and convincing evidence" of flight risk or of danger to an individual or witness. In February 2022, his campaign told the Milwaukee Journal Sentinel that Barnes still supports the proposal, and if elected to the Senate, he would support a bill to end cash bail nationwide.

Barnes served on the Assembly Committees on Corrections, Education, Jobs & the Economy, and Small Business Development. He also chaired the legislature's Black and Latino Caucus and helped lead a number of international delegations to the Middle East and southeast Asia.

2016 State Senate campaign
On April 11, 2016, Barnes announced that he would resign from the Assembly to launch a primary challenge against Lena Taylor, the Democratic incumbent in Wisconsin's 4th State Senate district. Political science professor and former State Senator Mordecai Lee expressed surprise, noting both the rarity of Democratic Senate primaries and Wisconsin's 90% reelection rate for incumbents. Lee framed the race as reflecting the broader struggle in the Democratic Party, pitting a young progressive challenger against an older, more centrist incumbent.

Barnes lost to Taylor in the August 9 election, with 7,433 votes to her 11,454.

Lieutenant Governor of Wisconsin (2019–2023)

2018 campaign 

In January 2018, Barnes announced his candidacy for lieutenant governor of Wisconsin in the 2018 election.

In June 2018, Barnes won the Democratic Party of Wisconsin straw poll with 80.9% of the vote, earning 617 out of 763 votes. During the primary, his name was omitted from election notices in three newspapers in two different counties. The day before the election, his picture was used in a local news report about a fatal motorcycle crash.

On August 14, 2018, Barnes won the Democratic primary in a landslide over Sheboygan businessman Kurt Kober, and became the running mate of Democratic gubernatorial nominee Tony Evers. Evers and Barnes won the November 2018 election, narrowly defeating incumbent Republicans Scott Walker and Rebecca Kleefisch, 49.5% to 48.4%. Barnes became Wisconsin's first African American lieutenant governor and the nation's youngest lieutenant governor.

Tenure 

Barnes was appointed chair of the governor's task force on climate change in October 2019. In December 2020, the task force released its report containing 55 policy recommendations to address climate change in the state. For the 2020 Democratic National Convention in Milwaukee, he served as a vice chair of both the convention and the host committee.

In the first two months of his term, Barnes faced criticism for having logged more hours of security protection than the last lieutenant governor had in all of 2018, although Governor Evers's office approved the additional security. In August 2022, the issue resurfaced when Barnes (now three years into his tenure) had reportedly used ten times as many security hours as his predecessor, who had declined security while doing personal tasks and did not run for the Senate while in office.

In 2019, Barnes gave the Working Families Party response to the State of the Union address.

On August 24, 2020, the day after the shooting of Jacob Blake, in Kenosha, Wisconsin, Barnes said it was "not an accident", and "This wasn't bad police work. This felt like some sort of vendetta taken out on a member of our community." On January 5, 2021, he condemned the district attorney's decision not to prosecute the officers who shot Blake, tweeting, "The non-prosecuting DAs are as negligent as the officers in these situations".

2022 U.S. Senate campaign

On July 20, 2021, Barnes announced his candidacy for United States Senate in the 2022 election, contesting the seat held by Ron Johnson. Barnes was the eighth person to enter the race for the Democratic nomination. By July 29, 2022, all of Barnes's major competitors had withdrawn from the race and endorsed him, leaving his way clear to be the presumptive Democratic nominee.

Barnes and Johnson had the first of their two scheduled debates on October 7, 2022, in Milwaukee.

In the general election, Johnson defeated Barnes.  If elected, Barnes would have become the first black person to represent Wisconsin in the U.S. Senate.

Political positions 
Barnes has branded himself as a progressive and voted for Bernie Sanders in the 2016 and 2020 Wisconsin presidential primaries.

Abortion 
Barnes supports legislation that would codify federal protections of abortion rights nationwide, "to make Roe v Wade the law of the land", and would eliminate the U.S. Senate filibuster to pass such a bill.

Gun control 
Barnes has said he will "prioritize preventing gun violence by keeping guns out of the hands of dangerous people" if elected to the Senate, saying in May 2022, "We can save lives or we can kowtow to the gun lobby." He supports red-flag laws, universal background checks for gun sales, and bans on ghost guns, assault weapons, and high-capacity magazines. He would vote to repeal the Protection of Lawful Commerce in Arms Act, which gives manufacturers and dealers liability protection when a purchaser uses a firearm to commit a crime.

Healthcare 

Barnes supports Medicare for All as well as incremental steps like lowering the age of enrollment from 65. In September 2021, as a candidate for the Senate, Barnes said in a series of tweets, "In Washington, I'll be one of the few elected officials that have actually been on one of the programs we fund and debate" and, referring to when he was enrolled in the Medicaid-based program in 2018, "I've been on BadgerCare, and I've seen how critical it is for working people."

Other issues 
Barnes supports a Green New Deal, a $15/hour minimum wage, eliminating cash bail nationwide, and legalizing marijuana.

Electoral history

See also 
 List of lieutenant governors of Wisconsin
 List of minority governors and lieutenant governors in the United States

References

External links 

 Lieutenant Governor Mandela Barnes official government website
 Mandela Barnes for Wisconsin campaign website
 Biography at the Wisconsin Legislature

|-

|-

 

|-

1986 births
2020 United States presidential electors
20th-century African-American people
21st-century African-American politicians
21st-century American politicians
African-American state legislators in Wisconsin
Alabama A&M University alumni
American community activists
Candidates in the 2022 United States Senate elections
Democratic Party members of the Wisconsin State Assembly
Lieutenant Governors of Wisconsin
Living people
Politicians from Milwaukee